Jonathan Bolingi Mpangi Merikani (born 30 June 1994) is a Congolese professional footballer who plays as a striker for Thai League 1 club Buriram United and the DR Congo national team.

Club career
On 3 September 2019, he joined Eupen on a season-long loan. On 5 February 2021, Bolingi joined Swiss Super League side Lausanne-Sport on loan for the rest of the season with an option to make the deal permanent.

On 2 December 2021, Bolingi signed with Buriram United in Thailand.

International career

International goals
Scores and results list DR Congo's goal tally first.

Personal life
Bolingi is the son of former professional footballer, Mpangi Merikani.

Honours

Club
TP Mazembe
 Linafoot: 2013–14, 2015–16; runner-up: 2014–15
 CAF Champions League: 2015
 CAF Super Cup: 2016
 CAF Confederation Cup: 2016

Buriram United
 Thai League 1: 2021–22
 Thai FA Cup: 2021–22
Thai League Cup: 2021–22

Country
DR Congo
 African Nations Championship:  2016

References

External links
 
 SFL Profile

1994 births
Living people
Footballers from Kinshasa
Democratic Republic of the Congo footballers
Democratic Republic of the Congo international footballers
Association football forwards
2017 Africa Cup of Nations players
2019 Africa Cup of Nations players
Jomo Cosmos F.C. players
TP Mazembe players
Standard Liège players
Royal Excel Mouscron players
Royal Antwerp F.C. players
K.A.S. Eupen players
MKE Ankaragücü footballers
FC Lausanne-Sport players
National First Division players
Linafoot players
Jonathan Bolingi
Jonathan Bolingi
Belgian Pro League players
Süper Lig players
Swiss Super League players
Democratic Republic of the Congo expatriate footballers
Democratic Republic of the Congo expatriate sportspeople in South Africa
Democratic Republic of the Congo expatriate sportspeople in Belgium
Democratic Republic of the Congo expatriate sportspeople in Turkey
Democratic Republic of the Congo expatriate sportspeople in Switzerland
Democratic Republic of the Congo expatriate sportspeople in Thailand
Expatriate soccer players in South Africa
Expatriate footballers in Belgium
Expatriate footballers in Turkey
Expatriate footballers in Switzerland
Expatriate footballers in Thailand
21st-century Democratic Republic of the Congo people
Democratic Republic of the Congo A' international footballers
2016 African Nations Championship players